Coreini is a tribe of leaf-footed bugs in the family Coreidae. There are at least 20 genera and 70 described species in Coreini.

Genera
These 25 genera belong to the tribe Coreini:

 Althos Kirkaldy, 1904 i c g b
 Anasa Amyot & Serville, 1843 i c g b (squash bugs)
 Catorhintha Stål, 1859 i c g b
 Centrocoris Kolenati, 1845 i c g b
 Centroplax Horváth, 1932 i c g
 Cercinthinus Kiritshenko, 1916 i c g
 Cercinthus Stål, 1860 i c g
 Cimolus Stål, 1862 i c g b
 Coreus Fabricius, 1794 i c g
 Enoplops Amyot and Serville, 1843 i c g
 Eretmophora Stein, 1860 i c g
 Haidara Distant, 1908 i c g
 Haploprocta Stål, 1872 i c g
 Hypselonotus Hahn, 1833 i c g b
 Madura Stål, 1860 i c g b
 Namacus Amyot & Serville, 1843 i c g b
 Nisoscolopocerus Barber, 1928 i c g b
 Oannes Distant, 1911 i c g
 Scolopocerus Uhler, 1875 i c g b
 Sethenira Spinola, 1837 i c g b
 Spathocera Stein, 1860 i c g
 Syromastus Berthold in Latreille, 1827 i c g
 Vazquezitocoris Brailovsky, 1990 i c g b
 Villasitocoris Brailovsky, 1990 i c g b
 Zicca Amyot & Serville, 1843 i c g b

Data sources: i = ITIS, c = Catalogue of Life, g = GBIF, b = Bugguide.net

References

External links 
 
 
 

 
Coreinae
Hemiptera tribes